The 1981–82 West Ham United F.C. season was their first season in the First Division after their promotion the previous season. The club was managed by John Lyall and the team captain was Billy Bonds.

Season summary
The season started well for West Ham and they went unbeaten in their first nine league games. By the end of the year they sat in 7th place in the league. Four defeats in a row in December and January and a slump in form then occurred and they reached a low position of 14th at the end of February 1982. They finished in 9th place having drawn 10 of their home games and 16 games home and away. David Cross was the top scorer with 20 goals in all competitions and 16 in the league. The next highest scorer was Paul Goddard with 17. Ray Stewart made the most appearances; 51 in all competitions.
The season saw the only appearance for West Ham by future Liverpool and Ireland player, Ray Houghton and the last West Ham appearance for 1980 FA Cup Final winner with West Ham, Stuart Pearson.

First Division

Results
West Ham United's score comes first

Legend

Football League First Division

FA Cup

League Cup

Squad

References

West Ham United F.C. seasons
1982 sports events in London
West Ham United
West Ham United